Stuart Gordon is an American director, writer and producer.

Stuart Gordon may also refer to:

 Stuart Gordon (Brookside), a character from the British soap opera Brookside
 Stuart Gordon (musician) (1950–2014), musician with The Korgis
 Richard Gordon (Scottish author) (1947–2009), Scottish author who wrote under the pen name Stuart Gordon

See also
 George Stuart Gordon (1881–1942), British academic and professor of poetry 
 Stewart Gordon (disambiguation)
 Gordon Stuart (disambiguation)